Yantayuq (Quechua llam'a, llant'a, yanta firewood, -yuq a suffix, "the one with firewood", also spelled Yantayo), also known as Shallanqa (hispanicized spelling Shallanca), is a mountain in the Paryaqaqa mountain range in the Andes of Peru which reaches an altitude of approximately . It is located in the Junín Region, Yauli Province, in the districts of Suitucancha and Yauli. Yantayuq lies southwest of Putka and north of Qarwachuku.

Yantayuq is also the name of a small lake northwest of the mountain in the Yauli District at

References

Mountains of Peru
Mountains of Junín Region